Prosopochaeta setosa is a species of fly in the family Tachinidae.

Distribution
Peru.

References

Endemic fauna of Peru
Diptera of South America
Taxa named by Charles Henry Tyler Townsend
Dexiinae
Insects described in 1915